Ubach is a surname. Notable people of the surname include the following:

Alanna Ubach (born 1975), American actor
Anthony Ubach (1835–1907), Roman Catholic missionary
Christiana Ubach (born 1987), Brazilian actress
Miguel Vila Ubach (born 1972), Spanish jockey

See also
Wim Ubachs, Dutch physicist

Catalan-language surnames